Franklin County is a county in Southern Illinois. At the 2020 census, it had a population of 37,804. The largest city is West Frankfort and the county seat is Benton. This area of Southern Illinois is known locally as "Little Egypt".

History
Franklin County was established on January 2, 1818, and formed from parts of Gallatin and White counties. It was named for Benjamin Franklin.

Coal mining 
Coal was mined in Franklin County as early as 1889, at the King Coal Mine, located at Township 5 South, Range 3 East.

The high levels of gas found in Franklin County's coal deposits have resulted in mining disasters and explosions over the years. Between 1905 and 1968, there were eleven mine disasters. In 1905, the Zeigler No. 1 mine, located in Zeigler, had an explosion that killed about fifty people. In 1917, an explosion in Old Ben Mine No. 11, located in Christopher, killed 17. The worst explosion occurred in 1951, in the Orient No. 2 Mine in West Frankfort, in which 119 people died.

The West Frankfort quadrangle of Franklin County is home to 17 coal mines, according to a 2004 report.

Geography 
Wayne Fitzgerrell State Recreation Area is located in this county.

Climate and weather

In 1912, a tornado destroyed facilities at the Possum Ridge Mine.

On March 18, 1925, Franklin County was among five southern Illinois counties effected by the infamous Tri State Tornado. The storm cut across the southern edge of the county, hitting West Frankfort and destroying most of the northern side of town, causing significant damage to the town's mining facilities. Farther to the east, the village of Parrish was also struck, and was never rebuilt. The storm killed 192 people in Franklin County, injuring hundreds more and leaving scores of people homeless.

Adjacent counties 
 Jefferson County (north)
 Hamilton County (east)
 Saline County (southeast)
 Williamson County (south)
 Jackson County (southwest)
 Perry County (west)

Major highways

  Interstate 57
  Illinois Route 14
  Illinois Route 34
  Illinois Route 37
  Illinois Route 148
  Illinois Route 149
  Illinois Route 154
  Illinois Route 184

Demographics

As of the 2010 United States Census, there were 39,561 people, 16,617 households, and 10,912 families residing in the county. The racial makeup of the county was 97.7% white, 0.3% Asian, 0.3% American Indian, 0.3% black or African American, 0.3% from other races, and 1.1% from two or more races. Those of Hispanic or Latino origin made up 1.2% of the population. In terms of ancestry, 21.8% were German, 18.7% were Irish, 15.9% were English, 9.4% were American, and 5.7% were Italian.

Of the 16,617 households, 30.0% had children under the age of 18 living with them, 48.8% were married couples living together, 11.6% had a female householder with no husband present, 34.3% were non-families, and 30.0% of all households were made up of individuals. The average household size was 2.35 and the average family size was 2.88. The median age was 41.8 years.

The median income for a household in the county was $34,381 and the median income for a family was $43,170. Males had a median income of $39,122 versus $28,950 for females. The per capita income for the county was $18,504. About 14.5% of families and 19.8% of the population were below the poverty line, including 30.5% of those under age 18 and 9.9% of those age 65 or over.

Communities

Cities

 Benton (seat)
 Christopher
 Orient
 Sesser
 West Frankfort
 Zeigler

Villages

 Buckner
 Ewing
 Freeman Spur (mostly in Williamson County)
 Hanaford
 Macedonia (partly in Hamilton County)
 North City
 Royalton
 Thompsonville
 Valier
 West City

Census-designated place
 Mulkeytown

Townships
Franklin County is divided into twelve townships:

 Barren
 Benton
 Browning
 Cave
 Denning
 Eastern
 Ewing
 Frankfort
 Goode
 Northern
 Six Mile
 Tyrone

Unincorporated communities

 Akin
 Akin Junction
 Cleburne
 Deering City
 Frisco
 Kegley
 Meyer
 Parrish
 Pershing
 Plumfield
 Rend City
 Steel City
 Valier Patch
 West End
 Whittington

Education

Regional
 Franklin, Johnson, Massac, and Williamson County Regional Office of Education #21

Primary and secondary
 Christopher Unit School District #99 
 Sesser Unit School District 
 Benton School District #47 
 Frankfort Community Unit School District #168 
 Zeigler-Royalton Community Unit School District #188 
 Thompsonville Community Unit School District #174 
 Ewing-Northern Community Unit School District #115

Higher education
 John A. Logan College Extension Center - West Frankfort

Specialized
 Franklin & Jefferson County Special Education Cooperative

Politics
Franklin County voted mostly for Democratic US presidential candidates until 2000. Since then it has voted for Republican presidential nominees.

See also
 National Register of Historic Places listings in Franklin County, Illinois
 Ku Klux Klan in Southern Illinois
 Fourth Franklin County Courthouse

References 

 United States Census Bureau 2007 TIGER/Line Shapefiles
 United States Board on Geographic Names (GNIS)
 United States National Atlas

 
Illinois counties
1818 establishments in Illinois Territory
Populated places established in 1818
Franklin County, Illinois
Franklin County, Illinois
Pre-statehood history of Illinois